The    is the 17th season of the third tier of the Japanese football, and the 15th season since the establishment of Japan Football League. It started on 10 March and finished on 24 November.

Clubs
Due to unfortunate withdrawal of Arte Takasaki, the previous season has featured only 17 teams, but for 2013 the league has brought the number of teams back to 18. After having another team (Sagawa Shiga) ceasing its operations and withdrawing after the season, the league has welcomed into its ranks two newcomers, SC Sagamihara and Fukushima United. Both clubs are looking forward to eventual J. League promotion, with Sagamihara holding the associate membership status, and Fukushima having applied for it in 2007, though unsuccessfully.

Last season has for the first time ever featured direct exchange of teams between JFL and J. League. JFL champions and J. League associate members V-Varen Nagasaki were promoted at the expense of Machida Zelvia, who returned to JFL after only a single season in J2.

Tochigi Uva were on the brink of relegation, as their play-off series against Norbritz Hokkaido was tied after two rounds. It was decided in penalty shootout, which Tochigi club has won 4–1 and retained their place in the JFL.

On 26 February Blaublitz Akita and Zweigen Kanazawa were granted J. League associate membership status, bringing the number of such clubs to six, an all-time high mark for the league. On 20 August YSCC Yokohama's application was also granted by J. League, further increasing associate members count to seven. It raised again to 10 members after another J. League board session on 16 September, when applications of Fukushima United, FC Ryukyu and Fujieda MYFC were approved.

Change in rules
Promotion to J. League Division 2
As in the previous year, the league winner will promote to J. League Division 2 (J2) if it meets promotion criteria, and the runner-up will promote to J2 if it meets promotion criteria and win a home-and-away play-off against a J2 club.
As the establishment of J3 League, if a playoff is taken place, the losing team will go to J3, but not staying to JFL.
Relegation to regional leagues
As the establishment of J3 League leads to a number of teams' transfer in next year, only promotion of teams from regional leagues will take place, not relegation.

Table

Results

Top scorers

Updated to games played on 24 November 2013
Source: Japan Football League

Attendances

Post-season promotion and relegation

J2 Promotion playoffs
2013 J2/JFL Play-Offs (2013 J2・JFL入れ替え戦)
After conclusion of the JFL and J2 seasons, playoffs for participation in 2014 J2 season were contested by lowest-placed J2 club Gainare Tottori and Kamatamare Sanuki, who possess J2 license and have finished second in JFL. The playoffs took place on 1 and 8 December.

|}

Kamatamare Sanuki won the playoffs on aggregate and were promoted to 2014 J. League Division 2. Gainare Tottori were relegated to the newly created 2014 J3 League.

Promotion from Regional Leagues
After 10 of 18 teams were set to leave JFL for the newly created J3, the league announced that it would suffer a contraction and only 14 teams would participate in 2014. The league accommodated all winners of the Regional League promotion series and accepted applications from other Regional clubs that were willing to participate in the nationwide league.

The top three spots of the Regional League promotion series were occupied by Grulla Morioka, Fagiano Okayama Next and FC Kagoshima respectively, and Volca Kagoshima took the last spot. However, the Morioka club has been chosen by J. League for participation in the 2014 J3 season, and both Kagoshima clubs have announced their post-season merger to Kagoshima United. On 4 December the league announced the final list of promoted teams:
 Fagiano Okayama Next – Chūgoku Soccer League champions, 2nd place in Regional promotion play-offs.
 Kagoshima United – new club, created on merger of Volca Kagoshima and FC Kagoshima, Kyushu Soccer League respective champions and runners-up
 Vanraure Hachinohe – Tōhoku Soccer League runners-up, and J. League associate members
 Azul Claro Numazu – Tōkai Soccer League 4th place, and J. League associate members
 Maruyasu Industries – Tōkai Soccer League champions
 Renofa Yamaguchi – Chūgoku Soccer League 3rd place, Shakaijin Cup winners, and J. League associate members

References

External links

2013
3